A1 Team China was the Chinese team of A1 Grand Prix, a now defunct international racing series.

Management
The seat holder A1 Team China is Liu Yu (刘煜). Werner Gillis is the team principal, and technical support is provided by Team Astromega.

History

2008–09 season
Drivers: Cheng Congfu, Ho-Pin Tung

2007–08 season
Driver: Cheng Congfu

A mixed bag of results for the team, culminated in 13th position, including a podium at one of the team's home races in Zhuhai.

2006–07 season
Drivers: Cheng Congfu, Ho-Pin Tung

Fortunes changed for Team China, as the mix of Cheng and Tung managed to lift the team to 15th position, as well as scoring a podium.

2005–06 season
Drivers: Tengyi Jiang, Qinghua Ma

Team China were uncompetitive in the inaugural season, scoring points only once and finishing in 22nd position.

Drivers

Complete A1 Grand Prix results
(key), "spr" indicate a Sprint Race, "fea" indicate a Main Race.

References

External links

A1gp.com Official A1 Grand Prix Web Site
Official Team Website - A1 Team China

China A1 team
Chinese auto racing teams
National sports teams of China
Auto racing teams established in 2005
Auto racing teams disestablished in 2009